Saint-Louis-de-Gonzague is a municipality in the Les Etchemins Regional County Municipality in the Chaudière-Appalaches region of Quebec, Canada. Its population is 374 as of the Canada 2016 Census. It lies on the Canada–United States border.

Name
The origin of the name of the municipality is subject to debate and three versions are possible. It seems that settlers would have liked to name their parish Saint-Louis, but it was refused due to possible confusion with Saint-Louis-de-Kamouraska (now part of Kamouraska, Quebec). Monsignor Elzéar-Alexandre Taschereau then suggested to name it Saint-Louis-de-Gonzague, following saint Aloysius Gonzaga.

Another version would be that Cardinal Louis-Nazaire Bégin would have wanted to honour his patron saint, Aloysius Gonzaga.

Lastly, it could also have been to honour Louis-Philippe Pelletier, member of the Legislative Assembly of Quebec for Dorchester.

Post Office
The municipality's post office is named Ravignan, after French Jesuit Gustave Delacroix de Ravignan, who was a preacher at Notre-Dame de Paris.

References

Municipalities in Quebec
Incorporated places in Chaudière-Appalaches